The 1938 Temple Owls football team was an American football team that represented Temple University as an independent during the 1938 college football season. In its sixth season under head coach Pop Warner, the team compiled a 3–6–1 record and was outscored by a total of 170 to 97. The team played its home games at Temple Stadium in Philadelphia. Richard Wheeler was the team captain.

After the 1938 season, Warner retired from coaching at age 67. He had been a football coach since 1895, compiling a 319–106–32 record.

Schedule

References

Temple
Temple Owls football seasons
Temple Owls football